This is a list of managers and Technical Commissions that have guided the Italy national football team from 1910 to the present.

During the earliest days of Italian nation football, it was common for a Technical Commission to be appointed. The Commission took the role that a standard coach would currently play. Since 1967, the national team has been controlled by the coaches only.

Chronological

Per match

 Coach in bold currently active.

References

External links

 
Italy